Lewis Township is a township in Pottawattamie County, Iowa, USA.

History
Lewis Township is named for the Lewis brothers, pioneer settlers.

References

Townships in Pottawattamie County, Iowa
Townships in Iowa